Hieroglyphic Luwian (luwili) is a variant of the Luwian language, recorded in official and royal seals and a small number of monumental inscriptions. It is written in a hieroglyphic script known as Anatolian hieroglyphs.

A decipherment was presented by Emmanuel Laroche in 1960, building on partial decipherments proposed since the 1930s.
Corrections to the readings of certain signs as well as other clarifications were given by David Hawkins, Anna Morpurgo Davies and Günther Neumann in 1973, generally referred to as "the new readings".

Overview
According to Hittitologist Alwin Kloekhorst, Hieroglyphic Luwian may also be known as Empire Luwian or Iron Age Luwian, and is "closely related" to its sister language, Cuneiform Luwian. Similarly, Alice Mouton and Ilya Yakubovich separate Luwian into two distinct varieties: cuneiform and hieroglyphic - the latter of a more prestigious and elite use.

Inscriptions
The earliest hieroglyphs appear on official and royal seals, dating from the early 2nd millennium BC, but only from the 14th century BC is the unequivocal evidence for a full-fledged writing system. Whilst Dutch Hittitologist Willemijn Waal has persuasively argued that Luwian Hieroglyphic was already used for writing on wooden writing boards from the early second millennium BC onwards, the first monumental inscriptions confirmed as Luwian date to the Late Bronze Age, c. 14th to 13th centuries BC. After some two centuries of sparse material, the hieroglyphs resume in the Early Iron Age, c. 10th to 8th centuries BC. In the early 7th century BC, the Luwian hieroglyphic script, by then aged more than 700 years, falls into oblivion.

Script

A more elaborate monumental style is distinguished from more abstract linear or cursive forms of the script. In general, relief inscriptions prefer monumental forms, and incised ones prefer the linear form, but the styles are in principle interchangeable. Texts of several lines are usually written in boustrophedon style. Within a line, signs are usually written in vertical columns, but as in Egyptian hieroglyphs,  aesthetic considerations take precedence over correct reading order.

The script consists of the order of 500 unique signs, some with multiple values; a given sign may function as a logogram, a determinative or a syllabogram, or a combination thereof. The signs are numbered according to Laroche's sign list, with a prefix of 'L.' or '*'. Logograms are transcribed in Latin in capital letters. For example, *90, an image of a foot, is transcribed as PES when used logographically,  and with its phonemic value  ti when used as a syllabogram. In the rare cases where the logogram cannot be transliterated into Latin, it is rendered through its approximate Hittite equivalent, recorded in Italic capitals, e.g. *216 ARHA. The most up-to-date sign list is that of Marazzi (1998).

Hawkins,  Morpurgo-Davies and Neumann corrected some previous errors about sign values, in particular emending the reading of symbols *376 and *377 from i, ī to zi, za.

Roster of CV syllabograms:

Some signs are used as reading aid, marking the beginning of a word, the end of a word, or identifying a sign as a logogram. These are not mandatory and are used inconsistently.

Phonology
The script represents three vowels a, i, u and twelve consonants, h, k, l, m, n, p, r, s, t, w, y, z. Syllabograms have the structure V or CV, and more rarely CVCV. *383 ra/i, *439 wa/i and *445 la/i/u show multiple vocalization. Some syllabograms are homophonic, disambiguated with numbers in transliteration (as in cuneiform transliteration), notably, there are many (more than six) syllabograms each for phonemic  /sa/ and /ta/.

There is a tendency of rhotacism, replacing intervocalic d with r. Word-final stops and in some cases word-initial a- are elided. Suffixes -iya- and -uwa- may be syncopated to -i-, -u-.

Notes

Bibliography

Corpus of inscriptions
 Cambel, Halet. Corpus of hieroglyphic Luwian inscriptions. Volume 2: Karatepe-Aslantas - The Inscriptions: Facsimile Edition. Berlin, New York: De Gruyter, 2011 [1999]. https://doi.org/10.1515/9783110879759
 Hawkins, John David. Corpus of Hieroglyphic Luwian Inscriptions. Volume 1: Inscriptions of the Iron Age - Part 1: Text, Introduction, Karatepe, Karkamis, Tell Ahmar, Maras, Malatya, Commagene. Berlin, Boston: De Gruyter, 2012 [2000]. pp. 1-360. https://doi.org/10.1515/9783110804201
 __. Corpus of Hieroglyphic Luwian Inscriptions. Volume 1: Inscriptions of the Iron Age - Part 2: Text, Amuq, Aleppo, Hama, Tabal, Assur Letters, Miscellaneous, Seals, Indices. Berlin, Boston: De Gruyter, 2012 [2000]. pp. 361-641. https://doi.org/10.1515/9783110804201
 __. Corpus of Hieroglyphic Luwian Inscriptions. Volume 1: Inscriptions of the Iron Age - Part 3: Plates. Berlin, Boston: De Gruyter, 2012 [2000]. pp. 642-1007. https://doi.org/10.1515/9783110804201
 Payne, Annick. Iron Age Hieroglyphic Luwian Inscriptions. Writings from the Ancient World 29. Atlanta: Society of Biblical Literature, 2012.
 Peker, Hasan. Texts from Karkemish I: Luwian Hieroglyphic Inscriptions from the 2011–2015 Excavations. OrientLab Series Maior, Vol. 1. Bologna: Ante Quem, 2016. .

Studies
 
Laroche, Emil. 1960. Les hiéroglyphes hittites, Première partie, L'écriture. Paris.
Marazzi, M. 1998. Il Geroglifico Anatolico, Sviluppi della ricerca a venti anni dalla "ridecifrazione". Naples.
Melchert, H. Craig. 1996. "Anatolian Hieroglyphs", in The World's Writing Systems, ed. Peter T. Daniels and William Bright. New York and Oxford: Oxford University Press. .
 .
Melchert, H. Craig. 2004. "Luvian". In: The Cambridge Encyclopedia of the World's Ancient Languages. Ed.: Roger D. Woodard. Cambridge: Cambridge University Press. 
Payne, A. 2004. Hieroglyphic Luwian, Wiesbaden: Harrassowitz.
Plöchl, R. 2003. Einführung ins Hieroglyphen-Luwische. Dresden.
Woudhuizen, F. C. 2004. Luwian Hieroglyphic Monumental Rock and Stone Inscriptions from the Hittite Empire Period. Innsbruck. .
Woudhuizen, F. C. 2004. Selected Hieroglyphic Texts. Innsbruck. .
Yakubovich, Ilya. 2010. Sociolinguistics of the Luvian Language. Leiden

Further reading
 .
 .
 .

External links
 

Luwian language
Bronze Age writing systems
Anatolian hieroglyphs